Chawarit Kheawcha-oum (Thai ชวฤทธิ์ เขียวชะอุ่ม) (born January 16, 1979, in Samut Prakan, Thailand) is a Thai retired footballer.

Honours

International
 AFC U-17 Championship 1998 Winner with Thailand
Clubs
 Kor Royal Cup 2009 Winner with Chonburi FC

External links
Profile at Thaipremierleague.co.th

1979 births
Living people
Chawarit Kheawcha-oum
Chawarit Kheawcha-oum
Chawarit Kheawcha-oum
Chawarit Kheawcha-oum
Chawarit Kheawcha-oum
Association football defenders